Barbara Claassen Smucker (1 September 1915 –  29 July 2003) was an American writer, primarily of children's fiction, who lived in Canada from 1969 to 1993. She is the author of twelve books, including Underground to Canada (1977) which is still widely studied in Canadian schools and Days of Terror (1979) which  won the Canada Council Children's Literature Prize. In 1988, she received the Vicky Metcalf Award for a distinguished body of writing.

Born Barbara Claassen in Newton, Kansas, she studied for a year at Bethel College and then went to Kansas State University where  she received a Bachelor's degree in journalism in 1936. After graduation, she taught high school for a year and then worked as a journalist for The Evening Kansan-Republican. In 1939 she married Donovan Smucker, a Mennonite pastor and academic specialising in Christian ethics. They moved to Canada in 1969, where Donovan taught at Conrad Grebel College in Ontario while Barbara worked as a librarian, first as the children's librarian at Kitchener Public Library and then as the head librarian of Renison College (1977–1982). Most of her books were published while they were living in Canada. The couple returned to the United States in 1993, settling in Bluffton, Ohio. Donovan died in 2001. Barbara died two years later in the Mennonite Memorial Home at the age of 87. She was survived by two sons and a daughter.

Books 
 1955: Henry's Red Sea; Scottdale: Herald Press 
 1957: Cherokee Run; Scottdale: Herald Press 
 1966: Wigwam in the City, illustrated by Gil Miret; New York: Dutton (published as Susan; New York: Scholastic Book Services)
 1977: Underground to Canada, illustrated by Tom McNeely; Toronto: Clark, Irwin (published in 1978 as Runaway to Freedom: A Story of the Underground Railway, illustrated by Charles Lilly; New York: Harper)
 1979: Days of Terror; Scottdale: Herald Press 
 1983: Amish Adventure; Scottdale: Herald Press 
 1983: CMBC Junior Boys Rescue Team; Self Published (5 copies made, unknown if they still exist)
 1985: White Mist; Toronto: Clarke, Irwin 
 1987: Jacob's Little Giant; Markham, Ontario: Viking Kestrel
 1990: Incredible Jumbo; New York: Viking
 1996: Selina and the Bear Paw Quilt, illustrated by Janet Wilson; New York: Crown 
 1999: Selina and the Shoo-fly Pie, illustrated by Janet Wilson; New York: Stoddart Kids
 1999:''garth and the mermald

References

1915 births
2003 deaths
American children's writers
American young adult novelists
20th-century American women writers
20th-century American novelists
Mennonite writers
American Mennonites